Stephens County is a county located in the U.S. state of Oklahoma. As of the 2010 census, the population was 45,048. Its county seat is Duncan. The county was created at statehood, partly from the Chickasaw Nation in Indian Territory and partly from Comanche County in Oklahoma Territory. It was named for Texas politician John Hall Stephens.

Stephens County comprises the Duncan, OK micropolitan statistical area.

History
Stephens County was created at statehood from portions of both Oklahoma Territory and Indian Territory. About two-thirds of the area came from Pickens County, Chickasaw Nation, in the Indian Territory,  and the western third came from Comanche County, Oklahoma Territory. The town of Duncan was designated as the county seat. County offices were located in rented facilities in Duncan until the first courthouse was built in 1921. That building was replaced by a new facility in 1967.

Drilling for oil and gas began about 1910. The first production well did not come in until 1918. Production support activities soon followed. Erle P. Halliburton founded the Halliburton Oil Well Cementing Company in Duncan. The company has since grown into a multinational corporation with headquarters in Dubai and Houston, Texas.

Geography
It lies within the Red Bed plains. Although no major river is in the county, some creeks provide drainage. Wildhorse Creek in the eastern part flows into the Washita River. Beaver Creek in the western part of the county flows into the Red River. Lakes in the county include Lake Humphreys, Clear Creek Lake, Duncan Lake, Comanche Lake, and Waurika Lake.

Adjacent counties
 Grady County (north)
 Garvin County (northeast)
 Carter County (southeast)
 Jefferson County (south)
 Cotton County (southwest)
 Comanche County (northwest)

Demographics

As of the census of 2000,  43,182 people, 17,463 households, and 12,590 families wereresiding in the county.  The population density was 19/km2 (49/mi2).  There were 19,854 housing units at an average density of 9/km2 (23/mi2).  The racial makeup of the county was 88.37% White, 2.20% Black or African American, 4.92% Native American, 0.30% Asian, 0.03% Pacific Islander, 1.44% from other races, and 2.74% from two or more races.  3.96% of the population were Hispanic or Latino of any race.

There were 17,463 households, out of which 30.40% had children under the age of 18 living with them, 59.50% were married couples living together, 9.20% had a female householder with no husband present, and 27.90% were non-families. 25.30% of all households were made up of individuals, and 12.80% had someone living alone who was 65 years of age or older.  The average household size was 2.44 and the average family size was 2.91.

In the county, the population was spread out, with 24.60% under the age of 18, 7.80% from 18 to 24, 25.10% from 25 to 44, 24.00% from 45 to 64, and 18.50% who were 65 years of age or older.  The median age was 40 years. For every 100 females there were 93.70 males.  For every 100 females age 18 and over, there were 89.70 males.

The median income for a household in the county was $30,709, and the median income for a family was $36,371. Males had a median income of $30,428 versus $20,055 for females. The per capita income for the county was $16,357.  About 11.60% of families and 14.60% of the population were below the poverty line, including 19.50% of those under age 18 and 11.90% of those age 65 or over.

Politics

Communities

Cities
 Comanche
 Duncan (county seat)
 Marlow

Towns
 Bray
 Central High
 Empire City
 Velma

Village
 Loco

Census-designated place
 Meridian

Other unincorporated places
 Alma
 Corum
 Santa Fe
 Sunray

See also
 National Register of Historic Places listings in Stephens County, Oklahoma

References

Further reading

 
1907 establishments in Oklahoma
Populated places established in 1907